Miguel de Jesús (born September 19, 1981, Ponce, Puerto Rico), also known as Guelo Star, is a Puerto Rican reggaeton rapper, singer, lyricist, occasional producer and promoter. In his musical career, he has worked with artists such as Daddy Yankee, Pipe Calderón, De La Ghetto, Jowell & Randy, Wisin, Don Omar and Ivy Queen. He has been recognized three times for his compositions at the ASCAP Awards.

Professional career
He began his music career writing and producing for other artists, establishing himself in the world of reggaeton and rap. Initially, he was a part duo of Jamsha & Guelo Star: Los Puti-Puerkos. He started out working with DJ Blass on albums like @ria 51: Aliados Al Escuadron (1999) and Reggaeton Sex Vol. 2 (2000). In 2007, he joined forces with duos, Jaime Borges and Héctor Padilla (J-King & Maximan), and Randy Ortiz and Joel Muñoz (Jowell & Randy) and were taken on by the reggaeton producer of White Lion Records, Elías De León. They later became known as "Casa de Leones".

Their first special studio/compilation album was released on June 26, 2007, and their single hit song No Te Veo reached #4 in The Billboard Hot Latin Charts.

As of 2008 Casa de Leones stopped performing as a group, however, since this was a result of poor contract negotiation and not of any animosity within the group, sometimes they meet. The then ex-5 members are still signed by White Lion and still have a close working relationship. Later in 2008 he has been the person in charge of writing several themes of the musical album of the De La Ghetto in his debut titled massacre musical. Over the years, Miguel de Jesus Cruz, the singer's first name, has been part of some of the most popular hits. Winner of three consecutive years of the ASCAP Award as composer of the year for songs like "Soy una gargola" by Randy (2007), "Siente el boom" by Tito El Bambino feat. Randy (2007), "No te veo" (2007) and "Quitarte to '" by Tego Calderón feat. Randy (2008).

On November 6, 2012 he released his debut album The Movie Man under the HoLLyWooD Boyz Digital Media Group label in association with White Lion Records. It features collaborations from Jowell and Randy, La India, De la Ghetto, J-King & Maximan. Guelo Star returns to his position as one of the most relevant composers of the moment when he composed one of the most successful songs of the moment, "Amame o matame", performed by Ivy Queen and Don Omar. After the incredible acceptance of his compositions and after months of negotiations, his management office, GLAD Empire, was able to close the business with Universal Music Publishing Group, for the editorial management of its extraordinary catalog.

With a catalog that exceeds 500 compositions, Guelo Star has left his mark on numerous issues with important exponents such as De La Ghetto, Daddy Yankee, J Alvarez, J Balvin, Jory Boy, MC Ceja, Gotay, Dálmata and recently arrived the opportunity to compose the next single by Wisin & Yandel, "Todo Comienza En La Disco"."It is a great honor for me to be part of the Universal Music Publishing Group. I have always received a good treatment from them and I have a lot of work to show my team that I came to win with a lot of muse, concentration and, above all, discipline" commented Guelo Star. Currently, Guelo Star is finishing his long-awaited album, "The Movie Man 2". His new album will be released soon via the GLAD Empire label. In 2021, he released his own version of the Farruko's song titled "Pepas".

Discography

Studio albums 

 2012: The Movie Man
 2015: The Movie Under
2018: The Movie Man 2

Mixtapes 
 2012: Yums
 2013: Yums 2

Collaborative albums 

 2007: Casa De Leones (with Jowell & Randy, JKing & Maximan)

Song credits

"Notes"
 signifies a Lyricist or Songwriter 
 signifies a Composer

References

1981 births
Living people
Puerto Rican reggaeton musicians
Puerto Rican singer-songwriters
21st-century American singers